D.G. Khan Zoo is a zoo located in Dera Ghazi Khan, Punjab, Pakistan. It is operated by Forestry, Wildlife and Fisheries department, Punjab.

History
It was established in 1983-1985 covering an area of 12 acres under the development scheme “Promotion of Wildlife and control of Hunting in D.G. Khan”. Now it has been re-named as “D.G. Khan Zoo”. In 2015, Provincial Minister of Punjab for Forestry, Wildlife and Fisheries, Muhammad Asif Malik, announced increased funding so that the zoo could purchase new animals.

Facilities
 Amusement park
 Artificial waterfall
 Gazebo

Species and animals
The zoo has several animals and birds including Olive Baboon, Rhesus Monkey, Lion, Emu, White Peafowl, Chukar partridge, Common Peafowl, and Grey Partridge.
aba ithan koi sai news kani way khiyal kry

Entry fees and timing 

Public can enter into park after paying entrance fees. The fees is Rs.10 for adult and Rs. 5 for kids. Timing of zoo is 8 A.M. to sunset.

See also
Forestry, Wildlife and Fisheries department, Punjab

References

Zoos in Pakistan
Dera Ghazi Khan District